The Palácio da Liberdade is a building in Belo Horizonte, Brazil. Inaugurated in 1898, it served as the office of the government of Minas Gerais state for several decades. In the 1950s, the Governor Juscelino Kubitschek started building his new residence, the Palácio das Mangabeiras.

More recently, the Palácio da Liberdade is part of the Circuito Cultural da Praça da Liberdade and it is used for mandate's transfers solemn ceremonies.

Buildings and structures in Belo Horizonte